Cain (stylized in all caps) is a Christian country trio composed of Taylor, Madison, and Logan Cain and signed to Provident Label Group.

Origin 

Taylor, Madison and Logan Cain grew up in Alabama, where their dad was a pastor.  They were home schooled until high school.  Their musical career got an early start when at just four years old, Taylor wrote her first song, a Christmas song which also included Madison and Logan on vocal harmonies. Together, the siblings all attended Troy University in Alabama. 
 In 2012, the trio entered a contest to open for singer-songwriter Dave Barnes. After winning the contest, they quit their jobs and eventually moved to Nashville.

Career 

Cain would sign with Provident Label Group and release their first EP for the label in early 2020. In a short time it notched more than 2.5 million streams and landed a single on the Christian radio charts.  The single “Rise Up (Lazarus)” became a top 10 hit, eventually reaching No. 1 on Billboard’s Airplay Chart; the track spent four weeks topping the Billboard Audience based radio chart. The group also recorded a version of “Rise Up (Lazarus)” with Zach Williams.

Cain were nominated for the We Love Christian Music Awards’ Best New Artist of the Year in 2021 and were nominated for and won the K-Love 2021 Fan Award for Breakout Single for their song "Rise Up (Lazarus)".

Discography

Studio albums

EPs
 Cain (Independent, 2015)
 Cain (Provident, 2020)
 Wonderful  (Provident, 2021)

Singles

Awards and nominations

American Music Awards 

|-
| 2021
| Cain
| Favorite Artist – Contemporary Inspirational
| 
|}

GMA Dove Awards 

!
|-
| 2021
| Cain
| New Artist of the Year
| 
| 
|-
| rowspan="3" | 2022
| rowspan="2" | Rise Up
| Pop/Contemporary Album of the Year
| 
| rowspan="3" | 
|-
| Recorded Music Packaging of the Year
| 
|-
| Wonderful
| Christmas/Special Event Album of the Year
| 
|-
|}

References

External links

Cain discography at JesusFreakHideout.com

Musical groups established in 2012
Musical groups from Alabama
American Christian musical groups
Christian country groups
2012 establishments in Tennessee